Khoni is a census town in Thane district in the Indian state of Maharashtra.

Demographics
At the 2001 India census, Khoni had a population of 22,687. Males constituted 65% of the population and females 35%. Khoni had an average literacy rate of 67%, higher than the national average of 59.5%: male literacy was 72%, and female literacy was 68%. In Khoni, 14% of the population were under 6 years of age.

Khoni is situated on the Katai Naka Badlapur pipeline road.

References

Cities and towns in Thane district